Taung U Mandalay Region၊ Kyaukpadaung Township၊ Near Yangon-Mandalay Expressway. Taung U is the middle of Kyaukpadaung and Meiktila.

Biography
The old-fashioned Taung U (Faung Oo) was noted as an ancient name for the ancient Burmese kings. Ba Gyi Phe Lake is on the top of the village. Taungoo village has a five-day market.
North Side of Taung Oo village is the birthplace of Aung Min Khaung, the birthplace of Aung Min Khaung is Sin Myint Village.

Education
Taung U has a Basic Education High School

Social
Muditar Philanthropy
Damma School

Business
Depending on the market, you can trade and trade. The main products of the village are sesame, pulses, rice, plums, and maize.

Communication
Located next to Meiktila Road. Transportation is good. There are cars to Mandalay, Meiktila, Myingyan, Nyaung Oo, Taunggyi and Loikaw.

Nearby villages
|Yay Ngan in the East,
|Lat Pan Pyar in the West,
|Te Kone, Kan Ywar in the south,
|Tha Pyay Kine, Sin Myint in the north

Other highlights

References 

Mandalay Region
Subdivisions of Myanmar